The Kitchener-Waterloo Dutchmen were a Canadian football team based in Kitchener, Ontario and a member of the Ontario Rugby Football Union, a league that preceded the Canadian Football League. Other teams included the London Lords, Sarnia Imperials, Toronto Balmy Beach and Hamilton Wildcats. The Dutchmen played in the ORFU from 1953 to 1959, winning four consecutive ORFU titles from 1954 to 1957, with quarterback Bob Celeri and coach Harvey Johnson. The Dutchmen were the last ORFU team to have competed for the Grey Cup, losing to the Edmonton Eskimos in a semi-final game in 1954. The following year, ORFU teams would discontinue competing for the national championship title after it became apparent that the ORFU could no longer be competitive in those games. The Dutchmen ceased operations after the 1959 season, just one year before senior play in the ORFU would be discontinued.

Seasons

References

Ontario Rugby Football Union teams
Canadian football teams in Ontario
Defunct Canadian football teams
Sport in Kitchener, Ontario